Denesh Ramdin (born 13 March 1985) is a Trinidadian cricketer who played internationally for the West Indies. He is a right-handed wicketkeeper-batsman. He retired from all forms of international cricket in July 2022.

In July 2005, Ramdin made both his Test and One Day International debut against Sri Lanka and India respectively. He holds the record for the highest score by a West Indies wicket-keeper in ODIs with 169 as well as the second-highest in Tests with 166.

In 2010, Ramdin was dropped from the team and his central contract was not renewed. He was recalled to the ODI team in 2011 and the Test team in 2012. Ramdin was appointed Trinidad and Tobago's captain in November 2011.

In May 2014, he was rewarded with the Test captaincy as West Indies decided to replace Darren Sammy, but was replaced by Jason Holder in 2015, who in turn was replaced as West Indies Test captain by Kraigg Brathwaite .

Early career

Ramdin began playing cricket as a fast bowler but took up wicket-keeping because he was bored when not bowling. According to Ramdin he did not receive much coaching early in his career, though he did have sessions with David Williams and Jeff Dujon in which he worked on his wicket-keeping. He has captained both the West Indies' and Trinidad's Under-19 teams.

When the West Indies toured Sri Lanka in July and August 2005, the 19-year-old Ramdin was the only wicket-keeper in the 15-man squad, taking over from the incumbent Courtney Browne. Brown did not play international cricket after he was replaced by Ramdin and retired later that year at the age of 34. At the time of his selection, Ramdin had played in just first-class games of experience with three scores above fifty including one century. On Test debut Ramdin scored 56 runs before he was bowled by Gayan Wijekoon who was also playing his first Test. The West Indies embarked on the tour with only three of their first choice players (aside from captain Shivnarine Chanderpaul the rest of the West Indies players had just one Test century between them) because of a dispute over sponsorship and as expected lost both Tests. The Indian Oil Cup 2005 with Sri Lanka and India followed the Tests and Ramdin played his first ODIs in the tournament.

The West Indies toured Australia in October and November 2005. Australia, rebuilding after losing the Ashes earlier that year, won all three Tests. The West Indies did not register a century partnership until the fourth innings of the series when Ramdin, who scored 71, combined with Dwayne Bravo in just his seventh Test. In his five other innings in the series Ramdin managed a total of 100 runs, finishing with an average of 34.20 and scoring more runs in the series that his Australian counterpart Adam Gilchrist. During the series he received advice from Gilchrist and former Australian Test 'keeper Ian Healy regarding his batting and keeping. The West Indies next engagement was against New Zealand in February and March 2006. Of the nine international matches on the tour – three Tests, five ODIs, and a Twenty20 International – the West Indies won a single ODI and drew one Test, while New Zealand won the rest. Ramdin managed just 33 runs in the Tests, and 92 runs in the ODIs However such was Ramdin's importance to the side that he was one of seven players the West Indies Cricket Board were considering to take over as captain when Shivnarine Chanderpaul resigned from the position in April.

Dropped 

At this time Ramdin was competed to be first-choice wicket-keeper spot to Carlton Baugh in ODIs. Ultimately, only Ramdin was selected for the 2007 World Cup. However, Ramdin went on to cement his place as the West Indies wicket keeper in all forms of the game and was the vice-captain at one point, following the resignation from that position of Ramnaresh Sarwan. Ramdin scored his maiden Test century against England in the fourth Test at Barbados in 2009, going on to score 166 in a drawn match. He hit two centuries in the 2009–10 Regional Four Day Competition in the West Indies, at an average of 113.33, amassing 340 runs in 6 innings.

When South Africa toured in May and June 2010 Ramdin managed 63 runs in the three-Test series and 34 runs from five ODIs. The run of poor form meant Ramdin's central contract with the West Indies Cricket Board (WICB) was not renewed in August 2010. After a 2010–11 season in which Ramdin scored 460 runs in the Regional Four Day Competition, he was recalled to the team for the ODI series against India. When the WICB announced its list of centrally contracted players in October 2011 Ramdin was not included.

Trinidad and Tobago captaincy and return 

In November 2011 Trinidad and Tobago named Ramdin as their captain, replacing Darren Ganga. Under his leadership, Trinidad & Tobago won the Caribbean Twenty20 held in January 2012. Ramdin followed this up by finishing as his team's leading run-scorer in the 2011–12 Regional Four Day Competition. When the West Indies toured India in November and December Ramdin was the first-choice wicket-keeper for the ODI leg and played in all five matches. He managed 164 runs in the series, 96 of which came in a 153-run loss to India in the fourth ODI. The innings was the highest score by a West Indies 'keeper in ODIs. The West Indies lost the five-match series 4–1

A broken right thumb sustained in March forced him to miss the ODI series against Australia that month. After recovering from the injury Ramdin was recalled to the Test squad to tour England in May and July, replacing Baugh who had not contributed as many runs as the selectors hoped. Playing his first Tests since 2010 he set himself a target of scoring three half-centuries in the three-Test series. West Indies lost the first two matches and Ramdin made scores of 6, 43, 1 and 6, prompting former player Viv Richards to remark "Ramdin just looks out of sorts.

When he first came into the game I felt he was a huge prospect. For some reason he has deteriorated in such a big way. Just the way he is walking back, he looks like a totally lost guy." In the final Test of the series Ramdin struck his second Test century, managing 107 not out. At the fall of the ninth wicket Ramdin was joined by Tino Best and the pair built a 143-run partnership, the highest stand for the tenth wicket by the West Indies and the third highest in Test history. On reaching his century, Ramdin produced a piece of paper from his pocket on which he had written a message for Richards the night before. The message read "Yeah Viv Talk Nah". The ICC fined Ramdin 20% of his match fee for "conduct contrary to the spirit of the game".

In the 2013 ICC Champions Trophy, Ramdin claimed a catch from batsman Misbah-ul-Haq. However television replays showed that the ball was not caught, and the matter was referred to the match referee. Ramdin was fined his full match fee and suspended for two matches.

In July 2013, Ramdin was dropped from West Indian squad for the first two ODIs against Pakistan in Guyana. Ramdin has hit only one half-century since his recall to the West Indies one-day side in October 2011 and has been dropped in several recent matches both during the Champions Trophy and the home tri-series which also featured India and Sri Lanka. In Ramdin's absence West Indies used opener Johnson Charles behind the stumps, and haven't picked any specialist wicketkeeper in the squad.

In December 2013, Ramdin scored century was only the 11th by a West Indies wicketkeeper in away Tests. Ramdin has scored three centuries in away Tests, equalling Clyde Walcott's record for most overseas hundreds by a West Indies wicketkeeper. The hundred in Hamilton is also Ramdin's fourth Test ton and he is one century away from equalling Jeff Dujon for the record of most hundreds by a West Indies wicketkeeper.

His 200-run partnership with Shivnarine Chanderpaul was only the eighth double-century partnership for the sixth wicket by West Indies batsmen. Ramdin and Chanderpaul came together with the West Indies score at 86 for 5 – the lowest score at which a West Indies pair, where the batsmen added 200 or more runs for the sixth or lower wickets, had begun the partnership.

In March 2014, Ramdin was ruing West Indies' series loss to England despite his record maiden hundred in the third and final One-Day International. Ramdin scored a superb 128, the first hundred by a West Indies wicket-keeper in one-day cricket but watched as the regional side fell short by 25 runs, to concede the series 2–1.

In March 2014, Ramdin affected four stumpings in Pakistan's innings at Sher-e-Bangla National Cricket Stadium in Mirpur equalling the record for the most stumpings in a T20 international. He was named as wicket keeper of the 'Team of the Tournament' by Cricinfo.Kamran Akmal also had affected four stumpings in a match against the Netherlands in the 2009 World T20.

Test captaincy 

In May 2014, Ramdin was named captain of the Test side and took over from Darren Sammy who remained the T20 captain. This means West Indies have three separate captains for all three formats with Dwayne Bravo in ODIs.

Ramdin's first assignment was the home series against New Zealand which began with a 2–1 series loss in June 2014. He has led the national side in three T20s and an ODI.

His experience with Trinidad and Tobago is more extensive with 37 matches at the helm across formats. He has 21 wins under his belt and took T&T to the semi-final of the Regional Four Day Competition in 2013–14 season.

In August 2014, Ramdin scored 169 runs off 121 balls with 8 fours and 11 sixes against Bangladesh at Warner Park in Basseterre, St Kitts. This was highest by a West Indies batsman at home beating Desmond Haynes' 152 not out against India at Bourda in Georgetown, Guyana in 1989 as well as highest by a West Indian wicketkeeper beating his own record of 127 against England at Sir Vivian Richards Stadium in North Sound earlier this year.

Ramdin's 11 sixes are the second highest by a West Indies batsman in an ODI just one short of Xavier Marshall's 12 sixes against Canada in 2008. Ramdin's 11 sixes in this match are also the highest by a wicketkeeper in an innings, beating Mahendra Singh Dhoni's 10 sixes against Sri Lanka at Sawai Mansingh Stadium in Jaipur in 2005.

T20 Franchise career
On 3 June 2018, he was selected to play for the Montreal Tigers in the players' draft for the inaugural edition of the Global T20 Canada tournament. In July 2020, he was named in the St Kitts & Nevis Patriots squad for the 2020 Caribbean Premier League.

Playing style 

Ramdin and Carlton Baugh jr. have been the two main contenders for the wicket-keeping position in the national side since 2005. While Ramdin's innings of 166 against England in 2009 is the second-highest score by a West Indian 'keeper in Tests, neither Ramdin nor Baugh have scored enough runs to secure the position.

Between 1960 and 2012 West Indian wicket-keepers averaged 24.68 runs per Test innings, and only Bangladesh has a worse average. Between May 2007 and May 2012, West Indian wicket-keepers scored 1,332 runs from 45 Tests; the batting average of 18.76 is the lowest amongst all ten Test teams in this period, nearly 10 runs behind the next lowest.

References

External links

1985 births
Living people
Trinidad and Tobago cricketers
West Indies One Day International cricketers
West Indies Test cricketers
West Indies Twenty20 International cricketers
West Indies Test cricket captains
Trinidad and Tobago cricket captains
Cricketers at the 2007 Cricket World Cup
Cricketers at the 2015 Cricket World Cup
Guyana Amazon Warriors cricketers
Sportspeople of Indian descent
West Indies B cricketers
Trinbago Knight Riders cricketers
Lahore Qalandars cricketers
Wicket-keepers